Santa Cruz is a parish in the municipality of Praia da Vitória on the island of Terceira in the Portuguese Azores. The population in 2011 was 6,690, in an area of 30.09 km2. It contains the localities Santa Luzia, Santa Rita, Juncal, Casa da Ribeira and Santa Cruz.

History

Since the beginning of the island's settlement, Praia has been an important centre: it was the centre of the first Captaincy of Terceira (1456–1470), under the command of Jácome de Bruges, then the first Donatary-Captain. Praia was elevated to the status town in 1480, under the stewardship of then Donatry-Captain Álvaro Martins Homem. At the end of the 15th and then 16th century, it contributed to the economy and prosperity of the region.

In 1582, D. António, Prior of Crato disembarked in the Praia, escaping his conflict with Philip II of Spain, where he was acclaimed by the peoples of the Azores. At the end of the Phillippian dynastic union, Francisco Ornelas da Câmara acclaimed D. John IV of Portugal as King of Portugal on 24 March 1641 in the courtyard of the parochial church. He was supported by the gathered populous, ending a period of Spanish occupation.

During the Liberal Wars between Liberals and Absolutists (1828–1834) the citizens of Praia sided with Liberal faction, resulting in a battle on 11 August 1829. An Miguelist armada, that included 21 ships and military troops that landed, confronted the local population, who resisted heroically and defeated the powerful armada. This victory influenced Queen D. Maria II to change and bestow the name of Praia da Vitória to community.

Its economic importance grew, even following the 15 June 1841 earthquake (known as the Caída da Praia) that completely destroyed the settlement. Owing to the efforts of Silvestre Ribeiro, the city was reconstructed.

But, this growth and development expanded significantly during the 20th century, with the arrival of the British and North American forces during the Second World War.

On 20 June 1981, the town was attributed the status of city.

Geography
Santa Cruz extends along the Serra do Facho, a ridge that extends from the northeast to southeast coast, encompassing that parishes of Lajes and Santa Cruz, that includes the bay of Praia and Ramo Grande area.

Economy
The international airport in Lajes-Santa Cruz and the oceanic port make Santa Cruz the central parish of the municipality, functioning as one of the principal commercial centres of the archipelago. Similarly, the industrial park, located in Praia bay, provides an integration of export commerce.

Notable citizens
 Álvaro Martins Homem (? — Praia, c.1482), 15th century explorer and first Donatary-Captain of Terceira;
 Francisco Ornelas da Câmara (Praia, 12 October 1606 — Praia, 28 April 1664), nobleman and politician who was instrumental in the Portuguese Restoration Wars, responsible for his military campaign against the Spanish-occupied Fortress of São João Baptista (1641–1642);
 Francisco Joaquim Moniz de Bettencourt (Praia da Vitória, 8 December 1847 — Évora, 9 September 1905), best known as Mendo Bem, was a bibliography, philanthropist, poet and journalist, contributing a large collection of books to the municipal library in Angra do Heroísmo;
 Alexandre Martins Pamplona Ramos (Praia da Vitória, 6 June 1865 — Angra do Heroísmo, 4 February 1933) was a medic and politician, notable for his combat against the Black Plague outbreak in the 20th century, eventually become the Civil Governor of the Autonomous District of Angra do Heroísmo;
 António Joaquim Sousa Júnior (Praia da Vitória, 15 December 1871 — Lisbon, 7 June 1938), better known as Sousa Júnior, was a medic and Republican politician, member of the constituent congress of 1911, in addition to Ministro da Instrução Pública (Minister of Public Instruction); he was the first minister responsible for education following the Portuguese Republic;
 Gervásio Lima  (Praia da Vitória, 26 March 1876 — Angra do Heroísmo, 24 February 1945), Gervásio da Silva Lima, was a prolific writer of prose, stories, theatre and enthnographic/historical studies;
 Vitorino Nemésio,  (Praia da Vitória, 19 December 1901 — Lisbon, 20 February 1978) poet and Romanticist author, renowned for his works Mau Tempo no Canal, Festa Redonda and Paço do Milhafre, as well as a professor at University of Lisbon.

References

Freguesias of Praia da Vitória